The Catedral of Saint Mary of Tortosa is a cathedral located in Tortosa, Catalonia, Spain and seat of the Diocese of Tortosa.  The present structure is located in the center of the city's old town.

Design
Its construction began in 1347 on the remains of a previous Romanesque cathedral. The cathedral was completed two centuries later. It was designed by Benito Dalguayre and has three naves with chapels between the buttresses and an ambulatory with radial chapels. The church is constructed in the Catalan Gothic style, though the façade, from the 18th century, is Baroque.

Archeological excavations on the site revealed that the cathedral was constructed on the site of an older Romanesque church, which was itself built on the site of the old Roman forum of Tortosa.

Images

References

External links 

 Web de l'ajuntament de Tortosa sobre la Catedral. 
 Plana del Bisbat de Tortosa 
 Canònica de Tortosa.
 Descripció i fotografies 

Roman Catholic cathedrals in Catalonia